Downtown Washington Historic District is a national historic district located at Washington, Franklin County, Missouri. The district encompasses 83 contributing buildings and 9 contributing structures in the central business district of Washington. The district developed between about 1849 and 1940, and includes representative examples of Greek Revival, Late Victorian, and American Craftsman style architecture. Located in the district is the separately listed Henry C. Thias House. Notable buildings include the St. Francis Borgia Catholic Church complex, U.S. Post Office (1922), Waterworks Building, Calvin Theater (1909), railway depot (1923), and Masonic lodge (1929).

It was listed on the National Register of Historic Places in 1989.

References

Historic districts on the National Register of Historic Places in Missouri
Greek Revival architecture in Missouri
Victorian architecture in Missouri
Buildings and structures in Franklin County, Missouri
National Register of Historic Places in Franklin County, Missouri